All Serbian Saints Serbian Orthodox Church (Serbian: Храм сабора српских светитеља) is a Serbian Orthodox church located in Mississauga, Ontario, Canada. It is dedicated to all the Serbian saints.

History
The construction of the church began in February 1983 with the purchase of the property located in Applewood Heights which previous to that was a school property. The main architect of the project was the eminent architect from Belgrade Predrag Ristić.

The foundation stone was blessed and laid by the Patriarch of the Serbian Orthodox Church Pavle during his visit to Canada on June 14, 1994. The foundations of the new church were blessed by the Bishop of Canada Georgije (Đokić) on November 26, 1995.

Due to the beginning of the breakup of Yugoslavia, the construction of the church was halted and was continued in 1999. The construction was completed in the Spring of 2002.

The church is built in the Byzantine style, traditional for Orthodox churches. It has three rows for choirs and a hand-made iconostasis. The main part of the church is a squared cross with only one cupola above the central part of the church. The altar was painted by the iconographer Dragomir "Dragan" Marunić.

The church was blessed on June 15, 2002, with the presence of Bishop of Canada Georgije, Metropolitan of Zagreb and Ljubljana Jovan (Pavlović), Metropolitan of Montenegro and the Littoral Amfilohije (Radović), Bishop of New Gračanica Longin (Krčo), Bishop of Britain and Scandinavia Dositej (Motika), Bishop of Central Europe Konstantin (Đokić), Bishop of Braničevo Ignatije (Midić), Bishop of Zahumlje and Herzegovina Grigorije (Durić), Greek Metropolitan Sotirios (Athanassoulas), Ukrainian Bishop Seraphim, the head of the Karađorđević dynasty Crown Prince Alexander and his spouse Crown Princess Katherine.

On July 31, 2022, the Serbian Canadian Monument designed by Lilly Otasevic honouring the first Serbian settlers in Ontario was erected and consecrated in the port of the church. The monument is dedicated to the generations of Serbs who preserved the Serbian heritage and tradition in Canada for over a century.

See also
 Saint Petka Serbian Orthodox Church
 Serbian Orthodox Eparchy of Canada
 Holy Transfiguration Monastery
 Holy Trinity Serbian Orthodox Church (Montreal)
 Saint Sava Serbian Orthodox Church (Toronto)
 Saint Arsenije Sremac Serbian Orthodox Church
 Holy Trinity Serbian Orthodox Church (Regina)
 Saint Michael the Archangel Serbian Orthodox Church (Toronto)
 St. Stefan Serbian Orthodox Church (Ottawa)
 Saint Nicholas Serbian Orthodox Cathedral (Hamilton, Ontario)
 Serbian Canadians

References

External links
 

Churches in Mississauga
Churches completed in 2002
Serbian Orthodox church buildings in Canada
Eastern Orthodox church buildings in Canada
Church buildings with domes
Serbian-Canadian culture
21st-century religious buildings and structures in Canada